Miljan Damjanović (born 1984) is a politician in Serbia. He served in the National Assembly of Serbia from 2016 to 2020 as a member of the far-right Serbian Radical Party.

Early life and career
Damjanović was born in Prizren, Kosovo, in what was then the Socialist Republic of Serbia in the Socialist Federal Republic of Yugoslavia. He is a graduate economist.

Political career
Damjanović joined the Radical Party in 2003 and was elected as a municipal official in Stari Grad, Belgrade in 2008. He subsequently became the leader of the Radical Party organization in Belgrade and a member of the party's national presidency. He announced a coalition government in Stari Grad in 2016 that included the Radical Party, its traditional ideological rival the Democratic Party, and other groups.

In 2011, Damjanović took part in a protest against the arrest and extradition of Ratko Mladić. He was quoted as saying, "[His arrest] is an act of treason by the regime. It proved that this country is not free. He's a hero."

Damjanović received the ninety-second position on the Radical Party's electoral list in the 2012 Serbian parliamentary election and the thirty-first position in the 2014 election. The party did not cross the electoral threshold to win representation in the National Assembly on either occasion. He was promoted to the eighth position on the Radical list for the 2016 election and was elected when the party won twenty-two mandates.

Damjanović is a member of the parliamentary committee on Kosovo-Metohija; a deputy member of the European integration committee; and a member of the parliamentary friendship groups for Belarus, China, and Russia. He is also a substitute member of the Serbian delegation in the Parliamentary Assembly of the Council of Europe and is an alternate delegate on the PACE committee on social health and sustainable development.

Damjanović announced in March 2017 that the Radical Party would send an international parliamentary delegation to Crimea to mark the three-year anniversary of the area's de facto joining of the Russian Federation.

References

1984 births
Living people
Members of the National Assembly (Serbia)
Substitute Members of the Parliamentary Assembly of the Council of Europe
Politicians from Prizren
Politicians from Belgrade
Serbian Radical Party politicians
Kosovo Serbs